This is about the house in Virginia. For the similarly named house and ranch in New Mexico, see Slaughter–Hill Ranch

The Slaughter–Hill House also known as the Corrie Hill House or the Roger Dixon House, is a historic home located at Culpeper, Culpeper County, Virginia. The original section was built about 1775, and enlarged with a frame addition in the early 19th century, and further enlarged about 1835–1840. It is a two-story, "L"-plan, log and frame dwelling with a central-passage plan. During the 1820s. it was the residence of Congressman and diplomat John Pendleton.

It was listed on the National Register of Historic Places in 1989.

References

Houses on the National Register of Historic Places in Virginia
Federal architecture in Virginia
Houses completed in 1775
Houses in Culpeper County, Virginia
National Register of Historic Places in Culpeper County, Virginia